Thyrocopa subahenea is a moth of the family Xyloryctidae. It was first described by Lord Walsingham in 1907. It is endemic to the Hawaiian islands of Molokai and Maui.

The length of the forewings is 8–12 mm. Adults are on wing year round. The ground color of the forewings is brown. There is significant variation in pattern, but most often the discal area is clouded with poorly defined blackish spots in the cell and a curving poorly defined whitish band through the terminal area and evenly spaced spots on the distal half of the costa and along the termen at the vein endings, though these are often faint. The hindwings are brown or light brown. The fringe is brown or light brown.

External links

Thyrocopa
Endemic moths of Hawaii
Biota of Molokai
Biota of Maui
Moths described in 1907